Russell "Rusty" Bowers (born October 20, 1952) is an American politician and the former Speaker of the Arizona House of Representatives. A member of the Republican Party, he represented the 25th legislative district from 2015 to 2023. He was elected Speaker in 2019.

Bowers previously represented the 21st legislative district in the Arizona House from 1993 to 1997 and in the Arizona Senate from 1997 to 2001. He is a classically trained artist specializing in watercolor, oil painting, and sculpting, and also has been involved in the construction and education industries.

In February 2022, Bowers filed paperwork to run for the Arizona Senate in the 10th district. He lost to Dave Farnsworth in the Republican primary.

Early life and education
Bowers, who is a fourth-generation Arizonan, grew up on a sheep ranch in Chino Valley. He attended Mesa Community College, Arizona State University, and Brigham Young University. A member of the Church of Jesus Christ of Latter-day Saints, he spent two years as a Mormon missionary in Mexico.

Resistance to overturning the 2020 presidential election 
 
Bowers refused to cooperate with the attempts to overturn the 2020 presidential election by publicly stating that there was no evidence of election fraud that would mandate rejection of the results of the 2020 United States presidential election in Arizona. On June 21, 2022, Bowers testified to the January 6 committee. As part of his testimony, he stated that when he asked Rudy Giuliani for evidence that there was fraud, Giuliani responded, "We have lots of theories, we just don't have the evidence".

Bowers also killed a bill in the Arizona House of Representatives which would have allowed the state legislature to override the results of a presidential election in Arizona.

In December 2020, colleague Senator Kelly Townsend wanted Bowers to call the legislature into session and  appoint an alternate slate of electors. When he refused, Townsend tweeted Bowers' home address and urged her militia followers to protest at his home.

For his efforts in resisting the attempts to overturn the 2020 election results, Bowers was awarded the John F. Kennedy Profile in Courage Award. He was one of five honorees to receive the award in 2022. Nevertheless, on July 19, 2022, the Arizona Republican Party censured Bowers for his resistance.

In 2022, Bowers ran for the State Senate, as he was being termed out from the State House. He lost the Republican primary for the State Senate by a nearly 2-to-1 margin, with the loss being attributed to his resistance to overturning the 2020 presidential election. In spite of the loss, Bowers said he had no regrets about his resistance and "would [have done] it again in a heartbeat".

Personal life
Bowers is married to Donetta Russell, with whom he has had seven children. Bowers is a painter and rancher. His property was deeply affected by a 2021 fire that ravaged his farm, and burnt his painting studio where much of his work, as well as a significant portion of his legislative papers, was stored.

In January 2021, Bowers announced the death of his daughter, Kacey Rae Bowers at 42, who had been fighting hepatic cancer for a "long period of time." Her last weeks were troubled by the presence of Trump supporters, one armed, demonstrating noisily outside Bowers' home.

Elections
 2014 – Bowers and Olson defeated Haydee Dawson, Michelle Udall and Jerry Walker in the Republican primary. Olson and Bowers defeated David Butler, Sheila Ogea, and Libertarian Michael Kielsky in the general election, with Bowers receiving 33,220 votes.
 2016 – Bowers and Udall defeated Ross Groen in the Republican primary. Bowers and Udall defeated Kathleen Rahn, with Bowers receiving 51,160 votes.
 2018 – Bowers and Udall defeated Marlene Hinton in the Republican primary. Bowers and Olson defeated Johnny Martin in the general election, with Bowers receiving 30,712 votes.

Awards
Presidential Citizens Medal, 2023

References

External links

 Official page at the Arizona State Legislature
 Campaign site
 Ballotpedia Page

|-

|-

|-

1952 births
21st-century American politicians
Brigham Young University alumni
Latter Day Saints from Arizona
Living people
Painters from Arizona
Politicians from Mesa, Arizona
Presidential Citizens Medal recipients
Republican Party members of the Arizona House of Representatives
Sculptors from Arizona
Speakers of the Arizona House of Representatives